Melbourne Square is a A$2.8 billion building complex of residential, hotel and commercial towers in the Southbank precinct of Melbourne, Victoria. The complex will be constructed in five stages, with an estimated completion in 2027. Stage one of the development commenced construction in November 2017, and was completed in May 2021.

The complex
The master planned precinct consists of six towers across a 20,260m2 site—four residential buildings (Towers 1 to 4), a hotel (Tower 5), and an office (Tower 6). This residential component of the complex will comprise approximately 2,610 apartments amongst the four towers. The commercial building, Tower 6, will reach  and comprise 37 floors. The complex will be built in five stages, with an anticipated completion date in 2027.

Proposed in June 2015 by the Malaysian property developer, OSK Property, designed by the Australian Cox Architects, with interiors by Carr Design Group, Melbourne Square received planning approval by Planning Minister Richard Wynne on 24 December 2015.

The A$2.8 billion complex is expected to become one of the largest development proposals in Victoria's history, encompassing a total  of floor space. In October 2017, Multiplex had been appointed to construct the first stage of the development, which will include the park, as well as two residential towers, and the new retail precinct; construction commenced in November that year, it was completed in May 2021.

See also
 List of tallest buildings in Melbourne

References

External links
93–119 Kavanagh Street Complex — on CTBUH Skyscraper Center
Website:  www.melbournesquare.com.au/

Skyscrapers in Melbourne
Residential skyscrapers in Australia
Apartment buildings in Melbourne
Office buildings in Melbourne
Proposed skyscrapers in Australia
Skyscraper hotels in Australia
Skyscraper office buildings in Australia
Buildings and structures in the City of Melbourne (LGA)
Southbank, Victoria